Benedikt Zech (born 3 November 1990) is an Austrian professional footballer who plays as a centre-back for Pogoń Szczecin.

References

1990 births
Living people
People from Feldkirch, Vorarlberg
Footballers from Vorarlberg
Austrian footballers
Association football defenders
Austrian Football Bundesliga players
2. Liga (Austria) players
Ekstraklasa players
SC Rheindorf Altach players
SC Austria Lustenau players
Pogoń Szczecin players
Expatriate footballers in Poland
Austrian expatriate footballers
Austrian expatriate sportspeople in Poland